The fourth seeds Nancye Wynne and Colin Long started their streak of four consecutive Australian Mixed Doubles titles by defeating the defending champions Nell Hopman and Harry Hopman 7–5, 2–6, 6–4, to win the mixed doubles tennis title at the 1940 Australian Championships.

Seeds

  Nell Hopman /  Harry Hopman (final)
  Joan Hartigan /  Vivian McGrath (semifinals)
  May Hardcastle /  John Bromwich (semifinals)
  Nancye Wynne /  Colin Long (champions)

Draw

Draw

Notes

References

External links
  Source for seedings and the draw

1940 in Australian tennis
Mixed Doubles